Grizzly Peak is a themed land at Disney California Adventure Park at the Disneyland Resort in Anaheim, California. The area is designed to look like the typical Californian National Park setting found in the 1950s. The land, originally named Grizzly Peak Recreation Area, opened with the park in 2001 as part of a subsection of a larger land, Golden State, which also included two other neighboring lands, Pacific Wharf and Condor Flats. The "Golden State" name was retired and the three sections were broken off into their own separate lands in 2012, as part of the park's redesign. The Condor Flats section was subsequently incorporated into the Grizzly Peak area, as Grizzly Peak Airfield, in 2015.

The land's name is eponymous with its central icon, Grizzly Peak.

Attractions

[[File:Soarin Over California Updated Entrance - July 17th 2015.JPG|thumb|Soarin''' in Grizzly Peak Airfield. Photo from July 17th, 2015.]]
 Grizzly River Run
 Redwood Creek Challenge Trail
 Soarin' Over California 

Former attractions
 The Magic of Brother Bear show
 Push the Talking Trash Can

Restaurants
 Smokejumpers Grill

 Characters 
 Pluto
 Chip 'n' Dale
 Judy Hopps (from Zootopia)
 Nick Wilde (from Zootopia'')
 Big Al (from Country Bear Jamboree)
 Wendell (from Country Bear Jamboree)
 Shaker (from Country Bear Jamboree)
 Liver Lips McGrowl (from Country Bear Jamboree)

Shopping
 Rushin' River Outfitters
 Humphrey's Service & Supplies

References

Disney California Adventure
Themed areas in Walt Disney Parks and Resorts
Forests in fiction
 
California in fiction
Parks in fiction